"I'd Rather" is a song by American singer Luther Vandross. It written and produced by Shep Crawford and recorded by Vandross for his eponymous album (2001). The song was released as the album's third and final single. "I'd Rather" became a top twenty hit on Billboards Adult Contemporary chart and reached the top forty on the Hot R&B/Hip-Hop Songs charts. It also topped the US Adult R&B Songs chart, the second single from Luther Vandross to do so.

Credits and personnel
Credits lifted from the liner notes of Luther Vandross.

 Tawatha Agee – backing vocalist
 Shep Crawford – instruments, producer, writer
 Paulette McWilliams – backing vocalist
 Cindy Mizelle – backing vocalist
 Kevin Owens – backing vocalist
 The Professa – guitar
 Fonzi Thornton – contractor
 Clinta Turner – backing vocalist
 Luther Vandross – vocals
 Brenda White-King – backing vocalist

Charts

Weekly charts

Year-end charts

References

2001 songs
2002 singles
Luther Vandross songs
Contemporary R&B ballads
Songs written by Shep Crawford
J Records singles
Soul ballads